Lardos is a Greek village on the Lardos stream, also called Fonias, located at the eastern part of the island of Rhodes, South Aegean region. In 2011 its population was 1,380.

Overview
The village is about 54 km south of the town of Rhodes and about 8 km west of ancient Lindos. It is an agriculture place with a bit of tourism located on the south east side of Rhodes coast.

See also
 Lartos, Rhodes

References

External links

South Rhodes website

Populated places in Rhodes